Michael James Green (born June 29, 1961) is a former professional American football player who played linebacker for three seasons for the San Diego Chargers.

References

1961 births
Living people
Sportspeople from Port Arthur, Texas
Players of American football from Texas
American football linebackers
Oklahoma State Cowboys football players
San Diego Chargers players